Nicole Toomey (born 29 January 1995) is a New Zealand international lawn bowler.

Bowls career
In 2021 Toomey won the New Zealand national single bowls title and was also named Bowls New Zealand Emerging Player of the Year (Female).

Toomey has been selected to represent New Zealand at the 2022 Commonwealth Games in Birmingham. She competed in the women's triples and the Women's fours at the Games. In both the triples and fours she secured a bronze medal.

References

External links
 
 

1995 births
Living people
New Zealand female bowls players
Commonwealth Games competitors for New Zealand
Commonwealth Games bronze medallists for New Zealand
Commonwealth Games medallists in lawn bowls
Bowls players at the 2022 Commonwealth Games
Sportspeople from Wellington City
21st-century New Zealand women
Medallists at the 2022 Commonwealth Games